Ad libitum, often shortened to "ad lib" denotes improvisation in various performing arts.

Ad Lib may also refer to:
 Ad Lib (album), a 1959 album by Jimmy Giuffre
 Ad Lib, Inc., a sound card manufacturer
 Ad Lib (typeface), a typeface by Freeman Craw
 The Ad Libs, a band
 Ad Lib (TV series), American music television series
 Ad Lib (comedy show), a British comedy show

Ad Libitum may also refer to:
 Ad Libitum Corporation, a 2020 Russian thriller film